Jonas is an unincorporated community in Monroe County, Pennsylvania, United States. The community is located on Route 534 in Polk Township. It is split between the Effort ZIP code of 18330 and the Kunkletown ZIP code of 18058.

Trexler Boy Scout Reservation is located just southeast of Jonas.

Polk Township Volunteer Fire Company has their sub-station located behind Hotel Jonas on Jonas Road. It currently housed their retired 1954 GMC along with an active engine and utility truck.

Hotel Jonas is a big part of the Village of Jonas and has been around for many years.  Jonas Snyder purchased the original inn building and surrounding land in 1858 and his family built the existing hotel in 1901. The Jonas Hotel began as a small inn that was known as "Sterner's", a rest stop for early travelers through northeastern Pennsylvania. It was situated on a stagecoach road that connected the southwestern end of the Pocono area with towns to the north such as White Haven and cities of Wilkes-Barre and Scranton. The road is presently named State Highway 534.

References 

Unincorporated communities in Monroe County, Pennsylvania
Unincorporated communities in Pennsylvania